Time Is Up is the second full-length album recorded by the thrash metal band Havok. It was released through Candlelight Records in 2011.

Background
In the pre-conception of the album, the band was going through many lineup changes, and as a result most of the material and demos for the album were written without a lead guitarist or drummer. Most of the songs on the album were written by frontman David Sanchez and bassist Jesse De Los Santos. By the time recording of Time Is Up had started, Reece Scruggs and Pete Webber had joined the band. There were 2 music videos made for the album, "D.O.A" and "Covering Fire".

Reception 

Time Is Up garnered generally favorable reviews in the metal community. Critics have cited the album as being "somewhat generic" in some parts. MetalUnderground.com compared the album to many classic thrash albums such as Metallica's ...And Justice for All, and Slayer's Reign in Blood.

Track listing

Personnel
Havok
 David Sanchez – lead vocals, rhythm guitar
 Reece Scruggs – lead guitar, backing vocals
 Jesse de los Santos – bass, backing vocals
 Pete Webber – drums

Artwork and design
 Halsey Swain – cover artwork

References

2011 albums
Havok (band) albums
Candlelight Records albums